George R. Valesente (born 1945) is a college baseball coach who has been the head coach of the Ithaca Bombers since 1979. He currently has an all-time record 1,105-498-8 at Ithaca College.

Career
Valesente attended Ithaca College, graduating in 1966. During his time as a student athlete he played on Ithaca's baseball, basketball, and soccer teams. His overall head coaching record, including time at SUNY Brockport, SUNY New Paltz, and State University of New York Maritime College, is 1,135-521-8. He was inducted into the American Baseball Coaches Association Hall of Fame in 2005.

References

1945 births
Living people
Place of birth missing (living people)
Brockport Golden Eagles baseball coaches
Buffalo Bisons (minor league) players
Burlington Senators players
Geneva Senators players
High school baseball coaches in the United States
Ithaca Bombers baseball coaches
Ithaca Bombers baseball players
Ithaca Bombers men's basketball players
Maritime Privateers baseball coaches
New Paltz Hawks baseball coaches
Pittsfield Senators players
Savannah Senators players